State Trunk Highway 36 (often called Highway 36, STH-36 or WIS 36) is a state highway in the U.S. state of Wisconsin. It runs in a diagonal southwest–northeast direction across southeastern Wisconsin from Springfield which is north of Lake Geneva to Milwaukee.

Route description 

WIS 36 begins at its intersection with WIS 120 and travels in a general northeasterly direction to an intersection with WIS 11 in Burlington.  The road continues northeast, passing through Waterford where it connects with WIS 164, then to Wind Lake and Muskego before heading to Franklin, where it runs concurrently with US Highway 45 (US 45) for a short distance, and crosses WIS 100. The highway then follows Loomis Road through Greendale and Greenfield, where it intersects with Interstate 43 (I-43) and I-894 before terminating at WIS 241 in Milwaukee.

History
WIS 36 is unusual in that its route has seen few changes since it was designated in 1918. In 1921, the route was shortened to end at the junction with what was then WIS 57, which later became US 41, and is now WIS 241. In 1919, WIS 36 was extended to the west along WIS 50 to Williams Bay, then turned to the south into Walworth County to join WIS 89 (now US 14) to its end at the Illinois state line.

The route would change again in 1968; WIS 36 terminated at Lake Geneva, and the portion from Williams Bay to Walworth was redesignated as WIS 67. Later, in 1987–1988, WIS 120 was extended north from Lake Geneva via WIS 36 to Springfield, and then north along County Trunk Highway G (CTH-G) toward East Troy, placing the end of the highway at its present location.

Major intersections

See also

References

External links

036
Transportation in Walworth County, Wisconsin
Transportation in Racine County, Wisconsin
Transportation in Waukesha County, Wisconsin
Transportation in Milwaukee County, Wisconsin